In computer science, an addressable heap is an abstract data type. Specifically, it is a mergeable heap supporting access to the elements of the heap via handles (also called references). It allows the key of the element referenced by a particular handle to be removed or decreased.

Definition 

An addressable heap supports the following operations:

 Make-Heap(), creating an empty heap.
 Insert(H,x), inserting an element x into the heap H, and returning a handle to it.
 Min(H), returning a handle to the minimum element, or Nil if no such element exists.
 Extract-Min(H), extracting and returning a handle to the minimum element, or Nil if no such element exists.
 Remove(h), removing the element referenced by h (from its respective heap).
 Decrease-Key(h,k), decreasing the key of the element referenced by h to k; illegal if k is larger than the key referenced by h.
 Merge(H1,H2), combining the elements of H1 and H2.

Examples 

Examples of addressable heaps include:

 Fibonacci heaps
 Binomial heaps

A more complete list with performance comparisons can be found here.

References 

Heaps (data structures)